Ben Whishaw is an English actor of the stage and screen.

Whishaw is known for his performances in film, television and the theatre. For his work in theatre he was nominated for a Laurence Olivier Award for Best Actor in a Play for his performance as the title role in Hamlet in 2005. He's received two Emmy Award nominations for his work in television winning an International Emmy Award for Best Actor for his performance in the British series Criminal Justice in 2009 and a Primetime Emmy Award for Outstanding Supporting Actor in a Limited Series or Movie for his performance as Norman Scott in the acclaimed limited series A Very English Scandal in 2019. He also received five BAFTA Award nominations winning twice for Best Actor for The Hollow Crown and for Best Supporting Actor for A Very English Scandal in 2019. He also received a Golden Globe Award for Best Supporting Actor – Series, Miniseries or Television Film for A Very English Scandal.

Major associations

Emmy Awards

BAFTA Awards

Golden Globe Awards

Laurence Olivier Awards

Screen Actors Guild Awards

Awards

Industry awards

Festival awards

Critics awards

Miscellaneous awards

Online awards

Notes

References 

Whishaw, Ben